Trel may refer to:

Fat Trel (born 1990), American rapper
Trel., taxonomic author abbreviation of William Trelease (1857–1945), American botanist and entomologist
Polish term for an area in the forest where felled timber is located, from which the surname Trela is derived

See also
La-Trel, abstract strategy board game designed by Richard Morgan
Trelly, former commune in the Manche department in Normandy in north-western France
Trell, a given name